Cornish Township is a township in Aitkin County, Minnesota, United States. The population was 28 as of the 2010 census.

History
Cornish Township was named for Charles E. and Milo F. Cornish, early settlers. It was incorporated on August 6, 1906.

Geography

Major highway
  Minnesota State Highway 65

Lakes
 Ball Bluff Lake
 Bay Lake
 Blackface Lake
 Boot Lake
 Cutaway Lake
 Little Ball Bluff Lake (south three-quarters)
 Little Red Horse Lake
 Long Lake
 Rat House Lake

Adjacent townships
 Ball Bluff Township (north)
 Balsam Township (southeast)
 Turner Township (south)
 Libby Township (southwest)
 Verdon Township (west)

Demographics
As of the census of 2000, there were 27 people, 13 households, and 10 families residing in the township. The population density was 0.8 people per square mile (0.3/km2). There were 66 housing units at an average density of 1.9/sq mi (0.7/km2). The racial makeup of the township was 100.00% White. Hispanic or Latino of any race were 3.70% of the population.

There were 13 households, out of which none had children under the age of 18 living with them, 69.2% were married couples living together, 7.7% had a female householder with no husband present, and 15.4% were non-families. 15.4% of all households were made up of individuals, and 7.7% had someone living alone who was 65 years of age or older. The average household size was 2.08 and the average family size was 2.27.

In the township the population was spread out, with 7.4% from 18 to 24, 11.1% from 25 to 44, 51.9% from 45 to 64, and 29.6% who were 65 years of age or older. The median age was 61 years. For every 100 females, there were 107.7 males. For every 100 females age 18 and over, there were 107.7 males.

The median income for a household in the township was $28,500, and the median income for a family was $29,000. Males had a median income of $28,750 versus $17,500 for females. The per capita income for the township was $16,188. None of the population and none of the families were below the poverty line.

References
 United States National Atlas
 United States Census Bureau 2007 TIGER/Line Shapefiles
 United States Board on Geographic Names (GNIS)

Townships in Aitkin County, Minnesota
Cornish-American culture in Minnesota
Townships in Minnesota